Ukri parish is an administrative unit of Dobele Municipality, Latvia.

Towns, villages and settlements of Ukri parish 

Parishes of Latvia
Dobele Municipality
Semigallia